Crocus nerimaniae  is a species of flowering plant in the genus Crocus of the family Iridaceae. It is a cormous perennial native to south western Turkey (east of Milosh).

References

nerimaniae